Distributed Evolutionary Algorithms in Python (DEAP) is an evolutionary computation framework for rapid prototyping and testing of ideas. It incorporates the data structures and tools required to implement most common evolutionary computation techniques such as genetic algorithm, genetic programming, evolution strategies, particle swarm optimization, differential evolution, traffic flow and estimation of distribution algorithm. It is developed at Université Laval since 2009.

Example 
The following code gives a quick overview how the Onemax problem optimization with genetic algorithm can be implemented with DEAP.
import array
import random
from deap import creator, base, tools, algorithms

creator.create("FitnessMax", base.Fitness, weights=(1.0,))
creator.create("Individual", array.array, typecode='b', fitness=creator.FitnessMax)

toolbox = base.Toolbox()
toolbox.register("attr_bool", random.randint, 0, 1)
toolbox.register("individual", tools.initRepeat, creator.Individual, toolbox.attr_bool, 100)
toolbox.register("population", tools.initRepeat, list, toolbox.individual)

evalOneMax = lambda individual: (sum(individual),)

toolbox.register("evaluate", evalOneMax)
toolbox.register("mate", tools.cxTwoPoint)
toolbox.register("mutate", tools.mutFlipBit, indpb=0.05)
toolbox.register("select", tools.selTournament, tournsize=3)

population = toolbox.population(n=300)
NGEN = 40

for gen in range(NGEN):
    offspring = algorithms.varAnd(population, toolbox, cxpb=0.5, mutpb=0.1)
    fits = toolbox.map(toolbox.evaluate, offspring)
    for fit, ind in zip(fits, offspring):
        ind.fitness.values = fit
    population = offspring

See also 
 Python SCOOP (software)

References

External links 
 
 

Articles with example Python (programming language) code
Evolutionary computation
Free science software
Python (programming language) scientific libraries